Crassiclava layardi is a species of sea snail, a marine gastropod mollusk in the family Pseudomelatomidae, the turrids and allies.

Description
The length of the shell attains 12 mm, its diameter 4 mm.

The smooth, turreted, narrowly claviform shell is reddish brown to uniform dark brown. It shows 7  moderately strong longitudinal ribs. It contains 7 obtusely angulated whorls, above the shoulder slightly concave, below almost convex. The spiral lirae are feeble. The aperture is oblong-ovate. The columella is upright and shows a slight callus  on top. The outer lip is arcuate with a wide sinus and not deeply emarginate.

Distribution
This marine species occurs from Table Bay to East London, Republic South Africa

References

 Turton W.H. (1932). Marine Shells of Port Alfred, S. Africa. Humphrey Milford, London, xvi + 331 pp., 70 pls. page(s): 22, pl. 4, sp. 170
 Kilburn, R.N. & Rippey, E. (1982) Sea Shells of Southern Africa. Macmillan South Africa, Johannesburg, xi + 249 pp. page(s): 116
 Steyn, D.G. & Lussi, M. (1998) Marine Shells of South Africa. An Illustrated Collector’s Guide to Beached Shells. Ekogilde Publishers, Hartebeespoort, South Africa, ii + 264 pp.
page(s): 152

External links

 

Endemic fauna of South Africa
layardi
Gastropods described in 1897